In enzymology, an alkane 1-monooxygenase is an enzyme that catalyzes the chemical reactions

an alkane + reduced rubredoxin + O2  a primary alcohol + oxidized rubredoxin + H2O.

Alkanes of 6 to 22 carbons have been observed as substrates. This enzyme belongs to the family of oxidoreductases, specifically those acting on paired donors, with oxygen as oxidant and incorporation or reduction of oxygen. The oxygen incorporated need not be derived from O2 with reduced iron-sulfur protein as one donor, and incorporation of one atom of oxygen into the other donor.  The systematic name of this enzyme class is alkane, reduced-rubredoxin:oxygen 1-oxidoreductase. Other names in common use include alkane 1-hydroxylase, omega-hydroxylase, fatty acid omega-hydroxylase, alkane monooxygenase, 1-hydroxylase, AlkB, and alkane hydroxylase.   It contains a diiron non-heme active site.

References

 
 

EC 1.14.15
Heme enzymes
Enzymes of unknown structure